Royal Air Force Long Marston or more simply RAF Long Marston is a former Royal Air Force station, that was opened in 1941 in the county of Warwickshire.

History
The airfield was constructed in 1940 upon privately owned arable farmland requisitioned in 1939 for war use by the Air Ministry, the builder John Laing & Son Ltd being contracted by the British Government for the task.

It possessed also a mix of 27 pan and spectacle dispersals, which were used to spread the aircraft around the site to make targeting of them more difficult in the event of an attack by the Luftwaffe, and air-raid shelters. The airfield was equipped with ground assault defensive concrete pill-boxes, two of them of the distinctive "F.C. Construction" (or "Mushroom") type. The facility also comprised billets to house up to 1,000 air personnel.

Unit history
The first RAF unit based at the Long Marston was Bomber Command's No.24 Operational Training Unit (OTU), flying Armstrong Whitworth Whitleys, Avro Ansons and Vickers Wellingtons, which began operating at the field on 15 March 1943, using it as a satellite airfield to RAF Honeybourne. The Whitleys joined the unit after retiring from front-line service as an early Second World War night bomber when new four engined bombers like the Avro Lancaster took over the offensive. Another unit based at the airfield was No. 1681 Bomber (Defence) Flight RAF flying Hawker Hurricanes and Curtiss Tomahawks, whose duties involved providing simulated attacks against OTU aircraft to train the OTU crews in how to defend their aircraft in combat conditions. Their main base was RAF Pershore, with Long Marston used as a satellite station between 1 July 1943 and 21 August 1944. No. 24 Operational Training Unit ceased operations and withdrew from using Long Marston on 24 July 1945, two months after the fall of Nazi Germany.

No. 9 Flying Training School RAF and No. 10 (Advanced) Flying Training School RAF were also here at some point.

Post-war the airfield's active use by the RAF came to an end, and its facilities were closed in the late 1940s and placed under the authority of No. 8 Maintenance Unit RAF, No. 3 Maintenance Group operating from RAF Little Rissington until 1954.

Accidents and incidents
RAF Long Marston experienced several accidents within its service life, such as:-

Post-military use
In 1954 RAF Long Marston was decommissioned from public use by the Air Ministry, and the site was returned to the possession of the private landowners of the property in 1939. It was renamed 'Long Marston Airfield', and its facilities were made use of for the next six decades as a site for motor-sports events, and a variety of other commercial enterprises.

See also
 List of former Royal Air Force stations

References

Citations

Bibliography

External links
 UKGA technical information
 Story of a WAAF who was stationed at Long Marston

Royal Air Force stations in Warwickshire
Royal Air Force stations in Worcestershire
Royal Air Force stations of World War II in the United Kingdom
History of Warwickshire